Tabbar is an Indian Hindi-Punjabi language  thriller streaming television series created and written by Harman Wadala, directed by Ajitpal Singh and produced by Ajay G. Rai for SonyLIV, and premiered on 15 October 2021. It stars Supriya Pathak, Pavan Malhotra, Gagan Arora, Kanwaljit Singh and Ranvir Shorey in lead role.

Cast
 Supriya Pathak as Sargun Kaur 
 Pavan Malhotra as Omkar Singh
 Ranvir Shorey as Ajeet Sodhi
 Kanwaljit Singh as Inderji
 Gagan Arora as Happy
 Sahil Mehta as Tegi
 Paramvir Singh Cheema as Lucky
 Nupur Nagpal as Palak Mahajan
 Ali Mughal as Multan, Ajeet's henchman
 Seema Kaushal as Tanu Mahajan, Palak's mother

Synopsis
The story centers around Omkar Singh, a Punjab Police retiree who lives in Jalandhar with his wife and two sons. Upon return from Delhi, the elder son (Happy) accidentally exchanges a similar-looking bag with another passenger's (Maheep Sodhi) at the train station. When Maheep, who is the younger brother of a businessman-turned-politician (Ajeet Sodhi) arrives at their home to reclaim his bag, a fateful incident occurs that puts Omkar and his family in a precarious predicament. The story of Tabbar follows the lengths Omkar will go to protect his family whilst navigating a web of deception and inquisition.

Reception

Tabbar received positive responses from the viewers and the critics. The Times of India stated it to be an "Engrossing and intense family drama". "The story keeps one hooked on to it," said Dainik Jagran. ABP called it to be an "Enthralling thriller with amazing performances".

MoneyControl stated, "the storytelling is so compelling that you will watch as the lies and blood keep mounting."

KoiMoi said, "Pavan Malhotra-led thriller is as dark as it gets without a minute of ease."

Prathyush Parasuraman of Firstpost wrote, The tension rarely slips, and the acting, aided by Sneha Khanwalkar’s moody melodies, ground you to a world you begin to care enough to be devastated for.

Shweta Keshri of India Today wrote, Tabbar boasts of some great performances. Pavan Malhotra is exceptionally good in the thriller, who gets into his character of Omkar Singh with ease.

Episodes

Series 1

References

External links
 
 Tabbar On Sonyliv

2021 Indian television series debuts
Indian thriller television series
Indian action television series
Hindi-language television shows
SonyLIV original films